In geometry, a pentagonal trapezohedron or deltohedron is the third in an infinite series of face-transitive polyhedra which are dual polyhedra to the antiprisms. It has ten faces (i.e., it is a decahedron) which are congruent kites.

It can be decomposed into two pentagonal pyramids and a pentagonal antiprism in the middle. It can also be decomposed into two pentagonal pyramids and a dodecahedron in the middle.

10-sided dice 

The pentagonal trapezohedron was patented for use as a gaming die (i.e. "game apparatus") in 1906. These dice are used for role-playing games that use percentile-based skills; however, a twenty-sided die can be labeled with the numbers 0-9 twice to use for percentages instead.

Subsequent patents on ten-sided dice have made minor refinements to the basic design by rounding or truncating the edges. This enables the die to tumble so that the outcome is less predictable. One such refinement became notorious at the 1980 Gen Con when the patent was incorrectly thought to cover ten-sided dice in general.

Ten-sided dice are commonly numbered from 0 to 9, as this allows two to be rolled in order to easily obtain a percentile result. Where one die represents the 'tens', the other represents 'units' therefore a result of 7 on the former and 0 on the latter would be combined to produce 70. A result of double-zero is commonly interpreted as 100. Some ten-sided dice (often called 'Percentile Dice') are sold in sets of two where one is numbered from 0 to 9 and the other from 00 to 90 in increments of 10, thus making it impossible to misinterpret which one is the tens and which the units die. Ten-sided dice may also be numbered 1 to 10 for use in games where a random number in this range is desirable, or the zero may be interpreted as 10 in this situation.

Spherical tiling
The pentagonal trapezohedron also exists as a spherical tiling, with 2 vertices on the poles, and alternating vertices equally spaced above and below the equator.

See also

References

Sources

External links 
Generalized formula of uniform polyhedron (trapezohedron) having 2n congruent right kite faces from Academia.edu
 
Virtual Reality Polyhedra www.georgehart.com: The Encyclopedia of Polyhedra
 VRML model
 Conway Notation for Polyhedra Try: "dA5"

Dice
Polyhedra

sv:Tärning#Tiosidig tärning